Yarnell is an unincorporated community in the towns of Couderay and Edgewater, Sawyer County, Wisconsin, United States.

History
A post office called Yarnell was established in 1915, and remained in operation until it was discontinued in 1933. The community was named for the Yarnell family, local settlers.

References

Unincorporated communities in Sawyer County, Wisconsin
Unincorporated communities in Wisconsin